Salum Khalfan Barwany or Salum Khalfani Bar'wani (born 30 June 1959) is a Tanzanian CUF politician and Member of Parliament for Lindi Town constituency since 2010. He is the first Tanzanian MP with albinism to be elected to parliament.

He was elected to the National Assembly of Tanzania on 2 November 2010 from the district of Lindi Urban in the far south-east, and is the first albino to be elected to the Bunge in the country's history (the first to sit in the legislature was a woman, Al-Shymaa Kway-Geer, who appointed to the Bunge by the President, two years earlier).

Upon his election, Bar'wani stated:

Tanzania is a country noted both for a high incidence of albinism, and persecution of people with albinism, especially by a cult of witchdoctors with considerable influence and power in rural areas.

References

Living people
1959 births
Civic United Front MPs
Tanzanian MPs 2010–2015
Mkonge Secondary School alumni
People with albinism
Albinism in Tanzania
Members of the National Assembly (Tanzania)